Wei Feng (born 6 September 2002) is a Chinese football player who currently plays for Guangzhou City.

Career

Wei made his debut against Changchun Yatai on 4 June 2022, coming on in the 81 minute for Tan Chun Lok.

Wei started his first game against Henan SSLM on 15 June 2022, coming off for  Liao Jiajun in the 57 minute.

References

External links

Living people
2002 births
Association football forwards
Chinese footballers
Guangzhou City F.C. players
Chinese Super League players